Nader Farhang Darehshori (born in Shiraz, Iran 15 December 1936)
is Chairman, President, CEO and Co-Founder of Aptius Education, Inc. He is a director at State Street Corporation and was a director of Aviva USA Corporation. He is a trustee of Wellesley College, the Dana–Farber Cancer Institute, and the Tanenbaum Center for Interreligious Understanding. He is on the EdNET Advisory Board and the Massachusetts Business Roundtable Board.

Darehshori came to the United States in 1961, in 1966 received a B.A. from the University of Wisconsin. The same year began to work in Houghton Mifflin as a Salesperson. He was President, Chairman and CEO of Houghton Mifflin from 1990 to 2000. He received an honorary degree of Doctor of Commercial Science from Suffolk University in 1992. He was Director, Chairman and Co-Founder of Cambium Learning, Inc. from 2004 to 2007 and still remains on the board.

References

Business Week Profile

American publishing chief executives
University of Wisconsin–Madison alumni
Living people
1936 births
American people of Iranian descent
20th-century American businesspeople